The 1995 Toray Pan Pacific Open was a women's tennis tournament played on indoor carpet courts at the Tokyo Metropolitan Gymnasium in Tokyo, Japan that was part of Tier I of the 1995 WTA Tour. The tournament was held from January 31 through February 5, 1995. Fifth-seeded Kimiko Date won the singles title and earned $148,500 first-prize money.

Finals

Singles

 Kimiko Date defeated  Lindsay Davenport 6–1, 6–2
 It was Date's only title of the year and the 5th of her career.

Doubles

 Gigi Fernández /  Natasha Zvereva defeated  Lindsay Davenport /  Rennae Stubbs 6–0, 6–3
 It was Fernández's 1st title of the year and the 56th of her career. It was Zvereva's 1st title of the year and the 56th of her career.

External links
 Official website 
 ITF tournament edition details

Toray Pan Pacific Open
Pan Pacific Open
Toray Pan Pacific Open
Toray Pan Pacific Open
Toray Pan Pacific Open
Toray Pan Pacific Open